Magnesium batteries are batteries that utilize magnesium cations as the active charge transporting agents in solution and often as the elemental anode of an electrochemical cell. Both non-rechargeable primary cell and rechargeable secondary cell chemistries have been investigated. Magnesium primary cell batteries have been commercialised and have found use as reserve and general use batteries.

Magnesium secondary cell batteries are an active topic of research, specifically as a possible replacement or improvement over lithium-ion–based battery chemistries in certain applications. A significant advantage of magnesium cells is their use of a solid magnesium anode, allowing a higher energy density cell design than that made with lithium, which in many instances requires an intercalated lithium anode. Insertion-type anodes ('magnesium ion') have also been researched.

Primary cells
Primary magnesium cells have been developed since the early 20th century. In the reactive anode, they take advantage of the low stability and high energy of magnesium metal, whose bonding is weaker by more than 250 kJ/mol compared to iron and most other transition metals, which bond strongly via their partially filled d-orbitals. A number of chemistries for reserve battery types have been researched, with cathode materials including silver chloride, copper(I) chloride, palladium(II) chloride, copper(I) iodide, copper(I) thiocyanate, manganese dioxide and air (oxygen). For example, a water-activated silver chloride/magnesium reserve battery became commercially available by 1943.

The magnesium dry battery type BA-4386 was fully commercialised, with costs per unit approaching that of zinc batteries – in comparison to equivalent zinc-carbon cells the batteries had greater capacity by volume, and longer shelf life. The BA-4386 was widely used by the US military from 1968 until ca.1984 when it was replaced by a lithium thionyl chloride battery.

A magnesium–air battery has a theoretical operating voltage of 3.1 V and energy density of 6.8 kWh/kg. General Electric produced a magnesium–air battery operating in neutral NaCl solution as early as the 1960s. The magnesium–air battery is a primary cell, but has the potential to be 'refuelable' by replacement of the anode and electrolyte. Some primary magnesium batteries have been commercialized and find use as land-based backup systems as well as undersea power sources, using seawater as the electrolyte.  The Mark 44 torpedo uses a water-activated magnesium battery.

Secondary cells

Overview
Secondary magnesium ion batteries, involving the reversible insertion and removal of Mg2+ ions in anodes and cathodes during charging and discharging, have been the subject of intensive research as a possible replacement or improvement on lithium-ion battery technologies in certain applications: In comparison to metallic lithium as an anode material, magnesium has a (theoretical) energy density per unit mass under half that of lithium (18.8 MJ/kg (~2205 mAh/g) vs. 42.3 MJ/kg), but a volumetric energy density around 50% higher (32.731 GJ/m3 (3833 mAh/mL) vs. 22.569 GJ/m3 ( 2046 mAh/mL). In comparison to metallic lithium anodes, magnesium anodes do not exhibit dendrite formation, albeit only in certain nonaqueous solvents and at current densities below ca. 1 mA/cm2. Such dendrite-free Mg deposition allows for magnesium metal to be used without an intercalation compound at the anode, thus raising the theoretical maximum relative volumetric energy density to around 5 times that of a lithium graphite electrode. Additionally, modeling and cell analysis have indicated that magnesium-based batteries may have a cost advantage over lithium due to the abundance of magnesium on earth and the relative scarcity of lithium deposits.

Potential use of a Mg-based battery had been recognised as early as the 1990s based on V2O5, TiS2, or Ti2S4 cathode materials and magnesium metal anodes. However, observation of instabilities in the discharge state and uncertainties on the role of water in the electrolyte limited progress was reported. In 2000, Israeli researchers reported dendrite-free Mg plating in AlCl3-ether electrolytes that show a fairy high (>2 V vs. Mg/Mg2+) anodic voltage stability limit. In that work, however, a low voltage (and somewhat expensive) posode material (chevrel-type Mo6S8) was used for Mg2+ intercalation. Despite the decade-plus of research following that discovery, all attempts to develop a high-voltage Mg2+ intercalation posode for the chloroaluminate (and related, less corrosive, see below) electrolytes have failed.
It is worth noting, that electrochemical Mg2+ intercalation into many solid materials is well known, for example from aqueous electrolytes. The problem is to find posode materials that show intercalation from the same solutions, which display reversible Mg metal plating.

In contrast to the Mg-metal batteries, discussed in the previous paragraph, Mg-ion batteries do not use Mg-metal on the negode, but rather a solid material capable of intercalating Mg2+ ions. Such batteries usually use an aqueous or other polar electrolyte. It is not clear if there is a commercially viable/competitive market niche for Mg-ion batteries.

Research

Anodes and electrolytes
A key drawback to using a metallic magnesium anode is the tendency to form a passivating (non-conducting) surface layer when recharging, blocking further charging (in contrast to lithium's behaviour). The passivating layer was thought to originate from decomposition of the electrolyte during magnesium ion reduction. Common counter ions such as perchlorate and tetrafluoroborate were found to contribute to passivation, as were some common polar aprotic solvents such as carbonates and nitriles. The formation of passivating layers on magnesium motivates the use of magnesium intermetallics as anode materials, as their lower reactivity with commonly used electrolytes makes them less prone to the formation of passivating layers. This is particularly true for the intermetallic compound Mg3Bi2, which constitutes a type of magnesium insertion electrode, based on reversible insertion of magnesium metal into a host compound. In addition to bismuth, tin and antimony have also been used in compound insertion electrodes for magnesium ion batteries. These have been shown to be able to prevent anode surface passivation, but suffered from anode destruction due to volumetric changes on insertion, as well as slow kinetics of insertion. Examples of insertion anode types researched include cycling between elemental Sn and Mg2Sn.

Grignard based ethereal electrolytes have been shown not to passivate; Magnesium organoborates also showed electroplating without passivation. The compound Mg(BPh2Bu2)2 was used in the first demonstrated rechargeable magnesium battery, but its usefulness was limited by electrochemical oxidation (i.e. a low anodic limit of the voltage window). Other electrolytes researched include borohydrides, phenolates, alkoxides,  amido based complexes (e.g. based on hexamethyldisilazane), carborane salts, fluorinated alkoxyborates, a Mg(BH4)(NH2) solid state electrolyte, and gel polymers containing Mg(AlCl2EtBu)2 in tetraglyme/PVDF.

The current wave of interest in magnesium-metal batteries started in 2000, when an Israeli group reported reversible magnesium plating from mixed solutions of magnesium chloride and aluminium chloride in ethers, such as THF. The primary advantage of this electrolyte is a significantly larger positive limit of the voltage window (and, thus, a higher battery voltage) than of the previously reported Mg plating electrolytes. Since then, several other Mg salts, less corrosive than chloride, have been reported.

One drawback compared to lithium is magnesium's higher charge (+2) in solution, which tends to result in increased viscosity and reduced mobility in the electrolyte. In solution a number of species may exist depending on counter ions/complexing agents – these often include singly charged species (e.g. MgCl+ in the presence of chloride) – though dimers are often formed (e.g. Mg2Cl3+). The movement of the magnesium ion into cathode host lattices is also (as of 2014) problematically slow.

The absence of chloride in the electrolyte was claimed to improve ion kinetics and so reduce the amount of electrolyte used, increasing performance.

A promising approach could be the combination of a Mg anode with a sulfur/carbon cathode. Then, a non-nucleophilic electrolyte is necessary which does not convert the sulfur into sulfide just by its reducing properties. Such electrolytes have been developed on the basis of chlorine-containing  and chlorine-free complex salts. This system is easy to synthesize, it shows an ionic conductivity similar to that of Li ion cells, its electrochemical stability window is up to 4.5 V, it is stable in air and versatile towards different solvents.

Cathode materials
For cathode materials a number of different compounds have been researched for suitability, including those used in magnesium primary batteries. New cathode materials investigated or proposed include zirconium disulfide, cobalt(II,III) oxide, tungsten diselenide, vanadium pentoxide and vanadate based cathodes. Cobalt based spinels showed inferior kinetics to magnesium insertion compared to their behaviour with lithium. In 2000 the chevrel phase form of Mo6S8 was shown to have good suitability as a cathode, enduring 2000 cycles at 100% discharge with a 15% loss; drawbacks were poor low temperature performance (reduced Mg mobility, compensated by substituting selenium), as well as a low voltage, ca. 1.2 V, and low energy density (110 mAh/g). A molybdenum disulfide cathode showed improved voltage and energy density, 1.8 V and 170 mAh/g. Transition metal sulfides are considered promising candidates for magnesium ion battery cathodes. A hybrid magnesium cell using a mixed magnesium/sodium electrolyte with sodium insertion into a nanocrystalline iron(II) disulfide cathode was reported in 2015.

Manganese dioxide based cathodes have shown good properties, but deteriorated on cycling due a conversion mechanism to form MgO.  Materials with the spinel structure have been shown to be electrochemically active in a Mg-ion configuration using a carbon-based adsorption anode. High voltage Mg-ion materials, including MgMn2O4, MgV2O4, and MgCr2O4 have been studied in detail to understand the Mg-ion diffusion pathways.  Recent work has identified another framework structure type, termed ("post spinels", with the prototypical formula CaFe2O4), as an active topic of research for magnesium-ion insertion cathodes.

In 2014 a rechargeable magnesium battery (conversion-type) was reported utilizing an ion exchanged, olivine type MgFeSiO4 cathode with a bis(trifluoromethylsulfonyl)imide/triglyme electrolyte – the cell showed a capacity of 300 mAh/g with a voltage of 2.4 V. MgMnSiO4 has also been investigated as a potential Mg2+ insertion cathode.

Cathodic materials other than non-inorganic metal oxide/sulfide types have also been investigated : in 2015 a cathode based on a polymer incorporating anthraquinone was reported; and other organic, and organo-polymer cathode materials capable of undergoing redox reactions have also been investigated, such as poly-2,2'-dithiodianiline. Quinone-based cathodes also formed the cathode a high energy density magnesium battery reported by researchers in 2019.

In 2016 a porous carbon/iodine combination cathode was reported as a potential alternative to Mg2+ insertion cathodes - the chemistry was reported as being potentially suitable for a rechargeable flow battery.

Commercialisation

In 2009-2016, an MIT spin-off, Pellion Technology, after receiving several million dollars from ARPA-E, unsuccessfully attempted to develop batteries based on Mg and other multivalent metals.

In October 2016, Honda and Saitec (Saitama Industrial Technology Center) claimed to have a commercialisable Mg battery, based on a xerogel cathode of vanadium pentoxide/sulfur. A commercialisation date of 2018 was also claimed.

In 2021, a design called Wonderlight won a prize at the Cannes innovation festival.

See also 
 List of battery types
 Magnesium-sulfur battery

Notes

References

Sources

Metal–air batteries
Rechargeable batteries
Magnesium
Battery types
Metal-ion batteries